The Dunaújváros Power Plant, located close to Dunaújváros city, is one of Hungary's largest biomass power plants, with an installed heat capacity of 160 MW and electric capacity of 50 MW. It was commissioned in 2016.

References

Biomass power stations in Hungary

Energy infrastructure completed in 2016